Michael Joseph Hill (born January 27, 1939) is an American professional golfer.

Born in Jackson, Michigan, Hill attended Arizona State University in Tempe and turned professional in 1967. Hill had three PGA Tour wins and his best finish in a major was a tie for eleventh at the PGA Championship in 1974.

Hill won 18 times on the Senior PGA Tour (now PGA Tour Champions) and topped the money list in 1991. He is the brother of PGA Tour player Dave Hill.

Professional wins (27)

PGA Tour wins (3)

Senior PGA Tour wins (18)

*Note: Tournament shortened to 36 holes due to weather.

Senior PGA Tour playoff record (5–1)

Other senior wins (6)
1989 Mazda Champions (with Patti Rizzo)
1991 Liberty Mutual Legends of Golf (with Lee Trevino)
1992 Liberty Mutual Legends of Golf (with Lee Trevino)
1995 Liberty Mutual Legends of Golf (with Lee Trevino)
1996 Liberty Mutual Legends of Golf (with Lee Trevino)
2000 Liberty Mutual Legends of Golf - Legendary Division (with Lee Trevino)

Results in major championships

Note: Hill never played in The Open Championship.

CUT = missed the half-way cut
"T" indicates a tie for a place

See also
Spring 1968 PGA Tour Qualifying School graduates
List of golfers with most PGA Tour Champions wins

External links

American male golfers
Arizona State Sun Devils men's golfers
PGA Tour golfers
PGA Tour Champions golfers
Golfers from Michigan
Sportspeople from Jackson, Michigan
1939 births
Living people